Musanda is a settlement in Kenya's Kakamega County on the border with Nyanza province.musanda

References 

Populated places in Western Province (Kenya)
Kakamega County